Jacques Noël (6 April 1920 – 7 October 2004) was a French fencer. He won a gold medal in the team foil event at the 1952 Summer Olympics.

References

External links
 

1920 births
2004 deaths
French male foil fencers
Olympic fencers of France
Fencers at the 1952 Summer Olympics
Olympic gold medalists for France
Olympic medalists in fencing
Medalists at the 1952 Summer Olympics
20th-century French people